There have been 21 editions of the FIFA World Cup which is an international association football tournament established in 1930. It is contested by the men's national teams which are members of FIFA, the sport's global governing body. The tournament has taken place every four years since its inauguration, apart from 1942 and 1946 due to World War II. The last tournament was hosted in Russia, which was won by France in 2018.

The World Cup final match is the last of the competition, and the result determines which country is declared world champions. If after 90 minutes of regular play the score is a draw, an additional 30-minute period of play, called extra time, is added. If such a game is still tied after extra time, it is then decided by a penalty shoot-out. The team winning the penalty shoot-out are then declared champions. The tournament has been decided by a one-off match on every occasion except 1950, when the tournament winner was decided by a final round-robin group contested by four teams (Uruguay, Brazil, Sweden, and Spain). Uruguay's 2–1 victory over Brazil was the decisive match (and one of the last two matches of the tournament) that put them ahead on points and ensured that they finished top of the group as world champions. Therefore, this match is regarded by FIFA as the de facto final of the 1950 World Cup.

Each final is hosted at usually the host nation's largest stadium, as the final attracts the largest crowds and the most attention. Two stadiums have hosted multiple finals, these being the Estadio Azteca in Mexico City, Mexico and the Maracanã Stadium in Rio de Janeiro, Brazil. Alongside those two cities, Rome, Italy has also hosted multiple finals. These were held at the Stadio Nazionale PNF and the Stadio Olimpico. Île-de-France has also hosted two finals, them being at the Stade Olympique de Colombes in Paris and the Stade de France in Saint-Denis.

List of stadiums

See also 

 List of FIFA World Cup finals
 List of FIFA World Cup stadiums

References

External links 

FIFA World Cup-related lists
FIFA World Cup stadiums
FIFA World Cup finals